Gyanendra Malla (born 16 September 1990) is a Nepalese professional cricketer and the former captain of the Nepal national Team. He is a right-handed batsman and an occasional wicket-keeper. He made his debut for Nepal against Namibia in March 2006. He was one of the eleven cricketers to play in Nepal's first ever One Day International (ODI) match, against the Netherlands, in August 2018.

Gyanendra Malla became the seventh Nepalese cricketer to score an international century, when he slammed 114 off 125 balls against Singapore during the 2014 ICC World Cricket League Division Three in October 2014.

Career

Early career
Malla made his debut for Nepal as a member of the U-15 cricket team in the year 2005. He then represented Nepal in ACC U-17 and finally ACC U-19, in the same year. He was named to Nepal U-19s' squad for the 2006 ICC Under-19 Cricket World Cup, following some impressive performances playing in the junior age levels. His career took off when he scored 145 runs in six innings, including 46* in the Plate semi-final of the U-19 World cup to beat South Africa U-19s. His reward was a place on the senior squad for the 2006 Intercontinental Cup.

Malla is known as the dependable batsman of Nepal's team who likes to build the innings under pressure. He has been an important member of the national team and has contributed to many of Nepal's historic successes. He holds the record of hammering six '4s' in an over on his way to scoring the fastest half-century for Nepal in One-Day matches off just 17 deliveries against Saudi Arabia in the 2012 ACC Trophy Elite. He then scored 212 runs with the impressive average of 42, including 2 fifties, which helped Nepal to win the title for the first time. His 86 runs against Canada in the 2014 Cricket World Cup Qualifier, 66 runs against USA in the final of 2012 Division Four, 76* against Qatar in the 2008 ACC Trophy Elite, 75 important runs against USA in the 2008 Division Five, and 67* off just 21 balls against Karnataka Institute of Cricket (India), (SAARC Under-25 Twenty20 Cup 2011) are some of the more memorable innings of his career.

He also represented Nepal in the 2014 ICC World Twenty20 in Bangladesh where he scored 83 runs in three innings at an average of 27.66.

He scored his maiden century against Singapore in the 2014 ICC World Cricket League Division Three in October 2014. He scored 241 runs in six innings at an average of 48.20 during the tournament. Earlier he scored 167 off 157 balls in a practice match against the Ragama Cricket Club, a first-class cricket team from Sri Lanka, when Nepal toured Sri Lanka in preparation for the tournament.

In the 2015 ICC World Cricket League Division Two, he scored 236 runs in 6 innings at an average of 59.00. Nepal qualified for the 2015–17 ICC World Cricket League Championship but failed to secure promotion to Division One and qualification to the 2015–17 ICC Intercontinental Cup.

In the World Cricket League, from 2008 Division Five to 2015 Division Two, he has scored 1262 runs in 45 innings at an average of 36.06, with a hundred and seven fifties.

2018-present
In July 2018, he was named in Nepal's squad for their One Day International (ODI) series against the Netherlands. These were Nepal's first ODI matches since gaining ODI status during the 2018 Cricket World Cup Qualifier. He made his ODI debut for Nepal against the Netherlands on 1 August 2018.

In August 2018, he was named the vice-captain of Nepal's squad for the 2018 Asia Cup Qualifier tournament. In October 2018, he was named in Nepal's squad in the Eastern sub-region group for the 2018–19 ICC World Twenty20 Asia Qualifier tournament.

In June 2019, he was named as the vice-captain of Nepal's squad for the Regional Finals of the 2018–19 ICC T20 World Cup Asia Qualifier tournament. On 24 July 2019, in the match against Malaysia, Malla captained Nepal after regular captain Paras Khadka did not play due to an injury. Nepal went on to win the rain-affected match by 7 wickets with Malla was adjudged man of the match for his half-century and smart captaincy.

He made his first-class debut on 6 November 2019, for Nepal against the Marylebone Cricket Club (MCC), during the MCC's tour of Nepal.

In November 2019, he was named as the captain of Nepal's squads for the 2019 ACC Emerging Teams Asia Cup in Bangladesh, and the cricket tournament at the 2019 South Asian Games. On 5 December 2019, he scored his first century in T20Is. The Nepal team won the bronze medal, after they beat the Maldives by five wickets in the third-place playoff match.

In September 2020, he was one of eighteen cricketers to be awarded with a central contract by the Cricket Association of Nepal. In January 2021, he was named as the captain in the Bagmati Province's squad for the 2021 Prime Minister Cup.

In December 2021, Malla along with Dipendra Singh Airee were sacked as captain and Vice-captain respectively, over disciplinary issues and instead Cricket Association of Nepal (CAN) appointed star leg-spinner Sandeep Lamichhane as the new skipper of Nepal national team.

References

External links 
 
Gyanendra Malla at CricketArchive

1990 births
Nepalese cricketers
Nepalese cricket captains
Nepal One Day International cricketers
Nepal Twenty20 International cricketers
Living people
Cricketers at the 2010 Asian Games
Cricketers at the 2014 Asian Games
Asian Games competitors for Nepal
South Asian Games bronze medalists for Nepal
South Asian Games medalists in cricket
Wicket-keepers